Elderslie High School is a government-funded co-educational comprehensive secondary day school, located in Narellan, a town in the Macarthur region, southwest of Sydney, New South Wales, Australia.

Established in 1977, the school provides education for approximately 950 students from Year 7 to Year 12. The school is operated by the New South Wales Department of Education; the principal is Jennifer Lawrence.

Feeder schools
Elderslie's feeder primary schools are Mawarra Public School, Elderslie Public School, Camden Public School, Camden South Public School, Cobbitty Public School, Harrington Park Public School and Spring Farm Public School.

See also 

 List of government schools in New South Wales
 Education in Australia

References

External links 
  
 New South Wales Department of Education - Elderslie High School

Public high schools in Sydney
Educational institutions established in 1977
1977 establishments in Australia
Macarthur (New South Wales)